Lucy Anderson is a former Member of the European Parliament for the London region for the Labour Party. She was elected in 2014, and stood down in 2019.

Political career
Anderson was the Councillor for Kentish Town on Camden Borough Council from 2002 – 2006 and following this she worked for the Greater London Authority and the National Union of Teachers.

Anderson supported Jeremy Corbyn during the 2015 Labour Party leadership election.

Professional career
Anderson is a lawyer with expertise in the areas of employment rights and equality law, transport and health.

References

Year of birth missing (living people)
Living people
MEPs for England 2014–2019
Labour Party (UK) MEPs
21st-century women MEPs for England
Lawyers from London
Place of birth missing (living people)
Labour Party (UK) councillors
Councillors in the London Borough of Camden
Women councillors in England